California Artificial Stone Paving Co. v. Molitor, 113 U.S. 609 (1885), involved a bill that was filed by the appellant against the appellee complaining that the latter was infringing on a letters patent granted to one John J. Schillinger, and which had been assigned for the State of California to the complainant.

The patent was for an improvement in concrete pavement was originally issued July 19, 1870, and reissued May 2, 1871. The improvement, as described in the reissued patent, consisted in laying the pavement in detached blocks separated from each other by strips of tar paper or other suitable material so as to prevent the blocks from adhering to each other. As stated in the specification:

The case of Wilson v. Barnum was especially worthy of note in this connection. The question certified in that case was whether, upon the evidence given, the defendant infringed the complainant's patent. Chief Justice Taney, delivering the opinion of the Court, said:

The case was dismissed, with directions to the circuit court to proceed therein according to law.

See also
List of United States Supreme Court cases, volume 113

References

External links
 
 

United States Supreme Court cases
United States Supreme Court cases of the Waite Court
1885 in United States case law
United States patent case law
Concrete